Ben Field (1876–1939) was a British actor.

Partial filmography

 Les cloches de Corneville (1917) - Iolo
 The Face at the Window (1920) - Peter Pottlebury
 The Bachelor's Club (1921) - Peter Parker
 Little Miss Nobody (1923) - Potter
 Venetian Lovers (1925) - William P. Bradshaw
 A South Sea Bubble (1928) - Isinglass
 The Man Who Changed His Name (1928) - Sir Ralph Whitcombe
 The Silver King (1929) - Coombes
 Escape (1930) - Captain
 Caste (1930) - Albert Eccles
 Sally in Our Alley (1931) - Sam Bilson
 Michael and Mary (1931) - Tullivant
 Murder on the Second Floor (1932) - Mr. Armitage
 Service for Ladies (1932) - Breslmeyer
 Jack's the Boy (1932) - Mr. Bobday
 When London Sleeps (1932) - Lamberti
 The Good Companions (1933) - Mr. Droke
 Loyalties (1933) - Gilman
 Mrs. Dane's Defence (1933) - Mr. Bulsom-Porter
 The Man from Toronto (1933) - Jonathan
 Little Miss Nobody (1933) - Sam Brightwell
 Say It with Flowers (1934) - Joe Bishop
 Love, Life and Laughter (1934) - Mayor Of Granau (uncredited)
 The Secret of the Loch (1934) - Piermaster
 Music Hall (1934) - Steve
 Sing As We Go (1934) - Nobby
 The Clairvoyant (1935) - Simon
 On Top of the World (1936) - Old Harry
 Secret Lives (1937) - Karl Schmidt
 The Girl in the Taxi (1937) - Dominique
 The Mysterious Mr. Davis (1939) - Decorator (final film role)

References

External links
 

1876 births
1939 deaths
English male film actors
Male actors from London
20th-century English male actors